Westmont is a village in DuPage County, Illinois, United States.

History 
The area known as Westmont earlier had been inhabited by the Potawatami. After several failed attempts by the U.S. government to persuade the Native Americans to move from the area, in 1833 they agreed under coercion to vacate their land for a nominal payment.

The development of the Illinois-Michigan Canal, authorized by the State of Illinois in the 1820s but delayed in construction until the 1830s, contributed to Westmont's early growth. Many of the workers turned to farming when the economic panic of 1837 halted canal construction; agriculture became the major occupation with produce sold in nearby Chicago. The area around Westmont became one of the most prosperous sections of the state.

In order to transport agricultural products into the city of Chicago, construction of a plank road from Chicago began in 1840. The path traversed the nine-mile (14 km) swamp between Chicago and the area that later became Westmont; it reached Naperville by 1851. Today, this path is known as Ogden Avenue (U.S. Route 34).

The plank road soon became inadequate; in 1858, local incorporated towns and villages petitioned the Chicago, Burlington and Quincy Railroad to build a branch line from Aurora to Chicago that would pass through their towns. The railroad line was approved, with the first train in 1864. "Gregg's Milk Station," from which Westmont developed, was a stop to load agricultural and dairy products. The town transitioned gradually from an agricultural community to a commuter community, with the early growth and development centered around the railroad station.

In the early 1900s, plats for the Village of Westmont were laid out and roads were dedicated; incorporation was decided by a vote of 41-28 in 1921. Westmont was officially incorporated on November 4, 1921; Vince Pastor served as the first president of the Village Board.

The current Westmont Public Library building opened in 1993.

Notable people 
 Robbie Russo, professional hockey player from Westmont who plays for the Arizona Coyotes
 Kira Salak, writer and journalist (National Geographic)
 Elton Simpson, one of two suspects of the 2015 Curtis Culwell Center attack in Garland, Texas.
 Ty Warner, industrialist and inventor of Beanie Babies
 Muddy Waters, musician, considered the father of Chicago blues; lived his last decade in Westmont prior to his 1983 death.

Geography
Westmont is located at  (41.794480, -87.976433).  It is bounded on the north by the Village of Oak Brook, on the east by the Village of Clarendon Hills, on the south by the City of Darien and on the west by the Village of Downers Grove. It is nearly wholly within Downers Grove Township.

Demographics

As of the 2020 census there were 24,429 people, 10,485 households, and 6,175 families residing in the village. The racial makeup of the village was 64.85% White, 6.97% African American, 0.43% Native American, 14.72% Asian, 0.07% Pacific Islander, 5.50% from other races, and 7.47% from two or more races. Hispanic or Latino of any race were 12.72% of the population.

There were 10,485 households, out of which 46.01% had children under the age of 18 living with them, 46.51% were married couples living together, 9.63% had a female householder with no husband present, and 41.11% were non-families. 36.57% of all households were made up of individuals, and 16.50% had someone living alone who was 65 years of age or older. The average household size was 3.07 and the average family size was 2.31.

The village's age distribution consisted of 20.4% under the age of 18, 6.9% from 18 to 24, 27.1% from 25 to 44, 27.4% from 45 to 64, and 18.3% who were 65 years of age or older. The median age was 40.1 years. For every 100 females, there were 85.8 males. For every 100 females age 18 and over, there were 85.3 males.

The median income for a household in the village was $69,902, and the median income for a family was $97,583. Males had a median income of $54,184 versus $40,258 for females. The per capita income for the village was $43,229. About 8.3% of families and 11.3% of the population were below the poverty line, including 16.0% of those under age 18 and 12.1% of those age 65 or over.

Economy

According to the 2021 Comprehensive Financial Report, the top employers in Westmont are:

The town officially opened a 94 unit luxury residential apartment building dubbed Quincy Station in 2022, a transit-oriented and pet-friendly development. Part of a larger effort towards revitalizing the Central Business District in Westmont.

Transportation 
Westmont has a Metra station on Metra's BNSF Railway Line, which provides daily rail service between Aurora, Illinois and Chicago's Union Station.  U.S. Route 34, Interstate 88 located north of the Village, Interstate 55 to the South, Interstate 294 to the East and Interstate 355 to the West provide access to the rest of the Chicago Region.

See also
William L. Gregg House

References

External links
 Official website
 Westmont Chamber of Commerce and Tourism Bureau
 

 
Villages in Illinois
Villages in DuPage County, Illinois
Populated places established in 1921
1921 establishments in Illinois